William Lee Estes (October 18, 1870 – June 14, 1930) was a United States district judge of the United States District Court for the Eastern District of Texas.

Education and career

Born in Boston, Texas, Estes received an Artium Baccalaureus degree from Hampden–Sydney College in 1891 and a Bachelor of Laws from the University of Texas School of Law in 1893. He was in private practice in Texarkana, Texas from 1894 to 1920.

Federal judicial service

On February 14, 1920, Estes was nominated by President Woodrow Wilson to a seat on the United States District Court for the Eastern District of Texas vacated by Judge Gordon J. Russell. Estes was confirmed by the United States Senate on February 18, 1920, and received his commission the same day. He served in that capacity until his death on June 14, 1930.

References

Sources
 

1870 births
1930 deaths
Judges of the United States District Court for the Eastern District of Texas
United States district court judges appointed by Woodrow Wilson
20th-century American judges
Hampden–Sydney College alumni
University of Texas School of Law alumni
Texas lawyers